Leonard Lightfoot (born December 2, 1947) is an American film and television actor. He is known for playing the attorney Leonard Rollins in the first season of the television sitcom series Silver Spoons. He also played Dep. Alvin Wiggins in the sitcom television series She's the Sheriff and Detective Henderson in Murder, She Wrote.

Lightfoot guest-starred in television programs including Seinfeld, Married... with Children, Quantum Leap, Diff'rent Strokes and The Pretender. He also appeared in three episodes of The Jeffersons as Officer Barrett.

Filmography

Film

Television

References

External links 

Rotten Tomatoes profile

1947 births
Living people
20th-century American male actors
American male film actors
American male television actors
People from Carlisle, Pennsylvania
Male actors from Pennsylvania
20th-century African-American people